Todd Huffman is an American technology entrepreneur and prolific photographer. He is a co-founder of the biomedical imaging company, 3Scan.

Career 
In 2011, Huffman co-founded 3Scan, a firm that develops new techniques for biomedical imaging. Biz Journals called 3Scan's main technology, the Knife-edge scanning microscope, a "robotic microscope." The microscope rapidly sections and scans samples, building 3d models of microscopic structures. Singularity Hub magazine quoted Huffman's description of their goal: “We’re trying to move from a world where humans are hunting and pecking through tissue looking for answers to a world where we generate large and reproducible data sets where we can use analytics to drive insights and real cures.”

In January 2015, Forbes magazine interviewed Huffman, asking him to explain the approach to technology his firm was taking.

In July 2016, Biz Journals reported that venture capital firms had invested an additional $11 million in 3Scan, reporting the total as $21 million.

Sharon Weinberger, author of a book about DARPA entitled The Imagineers of War, described Huffman influencing DARPA decision-makers, following a chance meeting where he described how he and other volunteers had used innovative modeling techniques to aid civilians in disaster zones and warzones. Huffman was a regular visitor to Jalalabad, in Afghanistan, where he worked with other technology workers affiliated with an informal group known as the Synergy Strike Force, using technology to help improve the quality of life for Afghan civilians and training them in the use of peaceful technologies such as computers and wireless internet.

Huffman is a cofounder of the BIL Conference, an unconference organized and observed by the participants as an unaffiliated counterpart to TED’s structured, ‘invite-only’ paid conference.

References

1980 births
Living people
American inventors
American businesspeople
American computer scientists